Michael Fly (born May 29, 1983) is an American college basketball coach and former head coach at  Florida Gulf Coast University.

Coaching career
Fly started coaching as a student at the University of Kentucky, assisting at NAIA Georgetown College for one season. After graduation, Fly became a video coordinator assistant for the NBA's Charlotte Bobcats for one season before taking a one year internship at NCAA's corporate offices. He returned to coaching joining Leonard Hamilton's staff at Florida State where he served as a video coordinator for three seasons. When Seminoles assistant Andy Enfield took the head coaching job at Florida Gulf Coast, Fly followed him to the Eagles as an assistant coach, and remained with the team as an assistant under Joe Dooley, as well. As an assistant, Fly was part of FGCU's Sweet 16 run in 2013, and was part of two other NCAA Tournament appearances in 2016 and 2017.

On April 5, 2018, Fly was promoted to become the fourth head coach in Florida Gulf Coast history, replacing Dooley who accepted the same position at East Carolina.

On March 5, 2022, Fly was released from the remainder of this contract as head coach at FGCU.

Head coaching record

References

Living people
1983 births
American men's basketball coaches
Basketball coaches from Kentucky
College men's basketball head coaches in the United States
Florida Gulf Coast Eagles men's basketball coaches
Florida State Seminoles men's basketball coaches
Georgetown Tigers men's basketball coaches
People from Fulton, Kentucky
University of Kentucky alumni